Lindsay Draper Jones (born June 9, 1969, Durham, North Carolina) is an American composer and sound designer for theater, television and film. He has also taught and lectured at numerous universities and schools across the country.

Early life 
At the age of three, he moved to Laurinburg, North Carolina, before finally moving to Winston-Salem, North Carolina at the age of eight, where he would spend the rest of his childhood. He attended the University of North Carolina School of the Arts and received a BFA in Acting.

Career

Theatrical 

Lindsay Jones began his career in sound design and composition for theatre in 1994 when he was asked to design a production of "Suburbia" for Roadworks Productions in Chicago.

Jones made his Broadway debut on October 20, 2013 with the production of "A Time To Kill" at the Golden Theatre, providing both original music and sound design. His second show on Broadway was "Bronx Bombers" at Circle in the Square Theatre, with its first performance on January 10, 2014. Jones has designed and composed for nearly 60 plays off-Broadway. He has designed and composed for over 500 plays at regional theaters across the United States.

Internationally, his work has been heard at The Royal Shakespeare Company (Stratford-Upon-Avon, England), Stratford Shakespeare Festival (Stratford, Ontario, Canada), Traverse Theatre (Edinburgh, Scotland), Market Theater (Johannesburg, South Africa), Baxter Theatre (Cape Town, South Africa), Standard Theatre (Harare, Zimbabwe), and the English Theatre (Vienna, Austria).

In addition, Jones collaborated in 2009 and 2010 with Bill T. Jones (no relation) and the Bill T. Jones/Arnie Zane Dance Company on a special multimedia dance concert entitled "Fondly Do We Hope, Fervently Do We Pray", based on the life of Abraham Lincoln. This show played many performances across the United States as well as around the world. The 2011 documentary film "A Good Man" was created about the artistic process of this project.

In October 2020, he was nominated for the Tony Award for Best Original Score for his work on Slave Play.

Film 

Lindsay Jones has composed numerous original scores for film, television, video games, commercials and other media projects.

His first major success in film came with the release of the 2005 documentary film A Note of Triumph: The Golden Age of Norman Corwin, directed by Eric Simonson and produced for HBO Films. The movie went on to win the Academy Award for Best Documentary (Short Subject) and Jones' score was described by a reviewer as "very varied and poignant" and "a great setting for Corwin's persona".

Other films that Jones has scored includes: The Brass Teapot  (directed by Ramaa Mosley), Defamation, Hollywood Forever, Mary, Ash, Grace, KinShip, Los Desaparecidos, Asparagus! Stalking The American Life, Urban Scrawls, American Passport, Armed Response, Alfred Mann, and Cleave Land.

He made his television scoring debut with Family Practice on the Lifetime Network, produced by Sony Television.

Jones recently made his first entry into scoring video games with The Digits: Fraction Blast.

Jones has created music for a number of commercials including Martha Stewart/Staples, Nike, the Life Foundation and the audio logo for Dow Microbial Control. In addition, an excerpt of Jones's sound design for "Fondly Do We Hope, Fervently Do We Pray" was featured on the CBS telecast of the 2010 Kennedy Center Honors.

Jones has also appeared as himself in the 2011 documentary film A Good Man.

Awards 

Jones has received seven Joseph Jefferson Awards and twenty-three nominations,
ASCAP Plus Awards
Two Ovation Awards and three nominations,
Los Angeles Drama Critics Circle Award,  
San Diego Theatre Critics Circle Award and two nominations, 
2010 Garland Award
Ticket Holder Award and a Chicago Stage Talk Award.
Received three nominations for Drama Desk Awards and two nominations for Helen Hayes Award
Nominations for Henry Hewes Design Awards, Barrymore Awards, LA Weekly Theatre Awards, Austin Critics Table Awards, Connecticut Critics Circle Awards, AUDELCO Awards and NAACP Theatre Awards. Lindsay was the first composer/sound designer to win the Michael Maggio Emerging Designer Award.

Other activities 

Lindsay Jones has taught and/or lectured at Yale University, Northwestern University, The Theatre School at DePaul University, The National High School Institute and Chicago Academy for the Arts.

Lindsay was the singer/bassist/songwriter for the Chicago-based rock band The Nubile Thangs!, from 1990 - 2001. The band released 3 albums, toured extensively throughout the US and Canada, and appeared on an episode of the television show America's Most Wanted. The band also appeared on several episodes of The Jenny Jones Show.

Lindsay appeared as Joe B Mauldin in the national Broadway tour of Buddy! The Buddy Holly Story in 1992-93.

Along with composer/sound designer John Gromada, Lindsay was the creator of The Collaborator Party, which is a yearly event for the entire theatre-sound community that was sparked by the elimination of The Tony Awards for sound design.

References

External links 

21st-century American composers
American audio engineers
1969 births
Living people